Tensa is a Town Wonder Natural Hill Station in Sundargarh District in the Indian state of Odisha. It has been declared the best mine by the Director General of Mines Safety, Govt. of India. Its origins are unknown, but it is believed it was tribal settlement prior to industrialization. In 1960 is came under the auspices of Steel Authority of India Limited (SAIL) Iron Mines. The township and ore processing plant were inaugurated by then governor of Odisha, Honourable Shri Yeshwant Narayan Sukthankar, on 25 April 1961.

Khandawhere waterfall, where the Odisha government leases the POSCO to mine Iron Ore, is a picnic spot nearer Tensa.

Demographics
 India census, Tensa had a population of 20,786, 52% male and 48% female. It has an average literacy rate of 68%, higher than the national average of 59.5%; male literacy is 75%, and female 61%. 12% of its population is under 6 years of age.

General information
Tensa is mostly of SAIL because of Iron Ore Mines and is situated near to Major Cities like Rourkela and towns such as Joda and Barbil which is connected with Capital City Bhubaneswar in Eastern India. Tensa is surrounded by Green Forest with mineral deposits . Tensa is located 100 kilometers from Rourkela . Tensa was then mainly developed by SAIL and later little by JSPL. Tensa now newly acquainted as Gram Panchayat in 2016.

Access
By Air: The nearest airport is at Rourkela, Jharsuguda & Bhubaneswar. Rourkela & Bhubaneswar are well connected to Tensa (township) by trains and buses.
By Rail: The nearest Barsuan Station is located at Barsuan Valley. There is only one Passenger train (per day) to Barsuan From Rourkela. It is connected by rail to major city nearby, Rourkela which is on the route of Howrah-Mumbai.
By Road: Daily bus services link Tensa From Rourkela, Koida, Barbil and Bhubaneswar.

Network availability
This town has suffered a great network issues lately but now on the month of november thery have installed two towers of airtel in the town and the network speed is great.Along with the bsnl and vodafone which you can use it for calling.But if you are coming to this town new and you are thinking about using a vodafone and bsnl it is a bad idea.you must have an airtel sim for
good internet connectivity.

References

Cities and towns in Sundergarh district